CA39 or CA-39 may refer to:
 California State Route 39
 California's 39th congressional district
 , a United States Navy cruiser
 Calcium-39 (Ca-39 or 39Ca), an isotope of calcium
 Caproni Ca.39, an Italian aircraft